Toiberry is a rural locality in the local government area (LGA) of Northern Midlands in the Central LGA region of Tasmania. The 2016 census recorded a population of 22 for the state suburb of Toiberry.

History 
Toiberry was gazetted as a locality in 1959. The area was originally gazetted as Little Hampton. Toiberry is believed to be an Aboriginal word for “ashes”.

Geography
Almost all of the boundaries are survey lines. The Western Railway Line passes through from north-east to north-west.

Road infrastructure 
Route C518 (Bishopsbourne Road) passes through from north-east to west.

References

Towns in Tasmania
Localities of Northern Midlands Council